Mary H. O'Connor (sometimes credited as Mary Hamilton O'Connor) was an American screenwriter and film editor active during Hollywood's silent era.

Biography 
She was born in Saint Paul, Minnesota, in 1872, the daughter of Thomas O'Connor and Bridget Nash. She came from a big family (which included a sister, Loyola O'Connor, who became an actress), and grew up in Minnesota, Oregon, and New York.

She began her career as a magazine and newspaper journalist in New York before Hollywood came calling. By 1913, she was living in Santa Monica and churning out scripts as a rapid pace under contract at Vitagraph. At the time, she said she hoped to become a director. Eventually, she was named chief of Triangle-Fine Arts' scenario department. She'd also work at Mutual and Famous Players-Lasky.

In 1921, she left Hollywood to work at Paramount's then-new London studio, where she worked on scripts for films like Dangerous Lies and The Mystery Road. She retired from screenwriting to work on creative fiction after those films.

Selected filmography 

The Lure of the Mask (1915)
The Lonesome Heart (1915)
Up from the Depths (1915)
A Yankee from the West (1915)
Infatuation (1915)
The Penitentes (1915)
Cross Currents (1916)
Hell-to-Pay Austin (1916)
The House Built Upon Sand (1916)
Intolerance (1916)
Nina, the Flower Girl (1917)
A Girl of the Timber Claims (1917)
Cheerful Givers (1917)
Souls Triumphant (1917)
The Sins of Roseanne (1920)
The Mystery Road (1921)
Dangerous Lies (1921)

References

External links

 Mary Hamilton O’Connor, the Grande Dame of Scenarists…
 
 
 

American women screenwriters
1872 births
1959 deaths
People from Saint Paul, Minnesota
Writers from Minnesota
American film editors
20th-century American women writers
20th-century American screenwriters
Women film pioneers